2000 AFC Asian Cup qualification was the qualification process organized by the Asian Football Confederation (AFC) to determine the participating teams for the 2000 AFC Asian Cup.

Groups

Group 1 

All matches were held in Dushanbe, Tajikistan.

Group 2 

Played in Aleppo, Syria.

Played in Tehran, Iran.

Group 3 

All matches played in Abu Dhabi, United Arab Emirates.

Group 4 

All matches played in Doha, Qatar.

Group 5 

All matches played in Kuwait.

Note: At the time this match was the largest score difference in FIFA A-level matches.

Group 6 

All matches played in Seoul, Korea Republic.

Group 7

Group 8 

Played in Kuala Lumpur, Malaysia.

Played in Bangkok, Thailand.

Group 9 

All matches played in Ho Chi Minh City, Vietnam.

Note: At the time this match was the largest score difference in FIFA A-level matches.

Group 10 

All matches played in Macau.

Qualified teams

External links 
RSSSF Details

Q
Qual
AFC Asian Cup qualification